At the Movies may refer to:

Television 
At the Movies (1982 TV program), an American program, originally known as At the Movies with Gene Siskel and Roger Ebert
At the Movies (1986 TV program), a successor/competitor program (1986–2010) to the original, which was also known as Siskel & Ebert & the Movies
Ebert Presents: At the Movies, a successor program (2011)
At the Movies (Australian TV program), an Australian program (2004–2014) with a similar format to the American program
"At the Movies" (Rugrats)
"At the Movies", an episode of Beavis and Butt-head

Music 
At the Movies (Creedence Clearwater Revival album), 1985
At the Movies (Mint 400 Records album), 2018
At the Movies (Stanley Clarke album), 1995
At the Movies (Richard & Adam album), 2014
At the Movies (Gary Williams album), 2017
At the Movies, an album by Sting
 At the Movies (Dave Koz album), 2007
"At the Movies", a song by Bad Brains from Rock for Light
Van Morrison at the Movies – Soundtrack Hits, a compilation album by Van Morrison

See also